"Behavioral sink" is a term invented by ethologist John B. Calhoun to describe a collapse in behavior which can result from overcrowding. The term and concept derive from a series of over-population experiments Calhoun conducted on Norway rats between 1958 and 1962.
In the experiments, Calhoun and his researchers created a series of "rat utopias" – enclosed spaces in which rats were given unlimited access to food and water, enabling unfettered population growth. Calhoun coined the term "behavioral sink" in his February 1, 1962 report in an article titled "Population Density and Social Pathology" in Scientific American on the rat experiment.
He would later perform similar experiments on mice, from 1968 to 1972.

Calhoun's work became used as an animal model of societal collapse, and his study has become a touchstone of urban sociology and psychology in general.

Experiments 
In the 1962 study, Calhoun described the behavior as follows:

Calhoun's early experiments with rats were carried out on farmland at Rockville, Maryland, starting in 1947.

While Calhoun was working at the National Institute of Mental Health (NIMH) in 1954, he began numerous experiments with rats and mice. During his first tests, he placed around 32 to 56 rats in a  case in a barn in Montgomery County. He separated the space into four rooms. Every room was specifically created to support a dozen matured brown Norwegian rats. Rats could maneuver between the rooms by using the ramps. Since Calhoun provided unlimited resources, such as water, food, and also protection from predators as well as from disease and weather, the rats were said to be in "rat utopia" or "mouse paradise", another psychologist explained.

Following his earlier experiments with rats, Calhoun later created his "Mortality-Inhibiting Environment for Mice" in 1968: a  cage for mice with food and water replenished to support any increase in population, which took his experimental approach to its limits. In his most famous experiment in the series, "Universe 25", population peaked at 2,200 mice and thereafter exhibited a variety of abnormal, often destructive, behaviors including refusal to engage in courtship, females abandoning their young. By the 600th day, the population was on its way to extinction. Though physically able to reproduce, the mice had lost the social skills required to mate.

The 1962 Scientific American article came at a time at which overpopulation had become a subject of great public interest, and had a considerable cultural influence.

Calhoun had phrased much of his work in anthropomorphic terms, in a way that made his ideas highly accessible to a lay audience.

Calhoun retired from NIMH in 1984, but continued to work on his research results until his death on September 7, 1995.

Explanation

The specific voluntary crowding of rats to which the term "behavioral sink" refers is thought to have resulted from the earlier involuntary crowding: individual rats became so used to the proximity of others while eating that they began to associate feeding with the company of other rats. Calhoun eventually found a way to prevent this by changing some of the settings and thereby decreased mortality somewhat, but the overall pathological consequences of overcrowding remained.

Applicability to humans 

Calhoun himself saw the fate of the population of mice as a metaphor for the potential fate of humankind. He characterized the social breakdown as a "spiritual death", with reference to bodily death as the "second death" mentioned in the Biblical verse .

Controversy exists over the implications of the experiment. Psychologist Jonathan Freedman's experiment recruited high school and university students to carry out a series of experiments that measured the effects of density on human behavior. He measured their stress, discomfort, aggression, competitiveness, and general unpleasantness. He declared to have found no appreciable negative effects in 1975. Researchers argued that "Calhoun's work was not simply about density in a physical sense, as number of individuals-per-square-unit-area, but was about degrees of social interaction."

See also 
 Hikikomori
 Mrs. Frisby and the Rats of NIMH
 Proxemics
 Rat Park
 Stand on Zanzibar
 Tang ping

References

External links
Fessenden, Marissa 2015, How 1960s Mouse Utopias Led to Grim Predictions for Future of Humanity, Smithsonian Magazine.
What Humans Can Learn From Calhoun's Rodent Utopia, Victor.

Crowd psychology
Ethology
Population ecology
1962 introductions